Saktiandi bin Supaat (Jawi: سقتيند سوڤات; born 1973) is a Singaporean politician and economist. A member of the governing People's Action Party (PAP), he has been the Member of Parliament (MP) representing the Toa Payoh East division of Bishan–Toa Payoh GRC since 2015.

Education
Saktiandi attended Henry Park Primary School, Raffles Institution and Catholic Junior College before graduating the University of Melbourne with a Bachelor of Commerce with honours degree and a Master of Social Sciences degree in applied economics from the National University of Singapore.

He subsequently went on to complete a Master of Business Administration degree at the University of Cambridge under the Monetary Authority of Singapore Postgraduate Scholarship, graduating with a High Distinction and among the top 10% of graduands on the Directors' List.

Career
An economist by profession, Saktiandi is currently the Executive Vice President and Head of FX Research team in Global Markets, Global Banking at Maybank.

Professional career
Prior to joining the private sector in 2010, Saktiandi was a lead economist in the Economic
Policy Department of the Monetary Authority of Singapore. At the central bank of Singapore, Saktiandi spent over ten years covering Singapore's financial strategy, macroeconometric modeling, foreign exchange markets and Singapore dollar exchange rate policy.

Saktiandi joined the United Overseas Bank Group as vice president and Senior Treasury Economist in Global Markets, Treasury-Economic Research, before moving to Maybank in 2011.

Political career
On 12 August 2015, the People's Action Party (PAP) announced Saktiandi as part of a five-member PAP team contesting in Bishan–Toa Payoh GRC in the 2015 general election after Wong Kan Seng, Hri Kumar and
Zainudin Nordin stepped down from their respective wards and politics. Saktiandi was elected into Parliament when the PAP team won with 73.59% of the valid votes. Saktiandi and the PAP team were elected as Members of Parliament for Bishan–Toa Payoh GRC for a second term but as a four-member team after the 2020 general election, garnering 67.26% of the valid votes.

Saktiandi was appointed the Chairman of the Transport Government Parliamentary Committee (GPC) in the 14th Parliament. He also sits on the Singapore Parliament's Public Accounts Committee and chairs the inter-parliamentary relations group for Middle East and Central Asia.

In Parliament, Saktiandi has raised various questions and issues including those around Singapore's public transport system, climate strategy and economic outlook. Saktiandi has also personally moved an Adjournment Motion in November 2019 on “Enhancing the Role of the Tripartite Alliance for Fair and Progressive Employment Practices (TAFEP) to Tackle Workplace and Job Discrimination’. He also recently raised an Adjournment Motion in 4 October 2022 on “Helping Singaporeans Navigate a High-interest Rate Environment”

Community involvement
Today, Saktiandi serves on the board of directors of the Tripartite Alliance for Fair and Progressive Employment Practices (TAFEP), and on the Council of Advisors to the Education Services Union. He is also a director at Yayasan MENDAKI (Council for the Development of Singapore Malay/Muslim Community), a pioneer self-help Group to uplift the Malay/Muslim community in Singapore, and the vice chair of Central Singapore Community Development Council (CDC).

Saktiandi started his voluntary community work at Young AMP, the youth wing of the Association of Muslim Professionals (AMP) from its inception in 2004.  Between 2010 and 2013, he was the president of Young AMP and a board director of AMP (2011-2013) as well as the vice-chairman of the AMP. He was also the chairman of the Malay/Muslim Community Leaders’ Forum (CLF) Labs steering committee, which focuses on providing seed funding for youth-driven community related social enterprise activities.

Previously, Saktiandi also served as a board member in SPRING Singapore and the Civil Service College. He was also a member of the REACH Supervisory Panel and the CPF Advisory Panel, as well as a member of the Charity Council and the 2015 SEA Games steering committee.

Saktiandi was also a member of the main steering committee on the Future Economy chaired by the Minister for Finance, to review Singapore's future economic strategies in 2015.

Personal life
Saktiandi is married with three children. He is fluent in the English, Malay and Indonesian languages.

References

External links
 Saktiandi Supaat on Parliament of Singapore

1973 births
Living people
Members of the Parliament of Singapore
People's Action Party politicians
Singaporean people of Javanese descent
Singaporean Muslims
Raffles Institution alumni
Raffles Junior College alumni
Alumni of the University of Cambridge